Catocala hermia, the Hermia underwing, is a moth of the family Erebidae. The species was first described by Henry Edwards in 1880. It is found throughout the Great Plains of North America, from southern Saskatchewan and Alberta south and west to Texas, Arizona and California.

The wingspan is 58–68 mm. Adults are on wing from August to September depending on the location.

The larvae feed on Populus and Salix species.

Subspecies
Catocala hermia hermia
Catocala hermia francisca H. Edwards, 1880
The latter is often treated as distinct species, leaving C. hermia monotypic.

Catocala hermia verecunda, recorded from Colorado, Montana and Arizona, was formerly considered a subspecies, but is now a synonym of Catocala hermia hermia.

References

External links

Oehlke, Bill "Catocala hermia Henry Edwards, 1880". The Catocala Website. Archived August 22, 2010.

hermia
Moths of North America
Moths described in 1880